New Bethel Cumberland Presbyterian Church is a historic church building near Greeneville in rural Greene County, Tennessee, United States.

The New Bethel congregation formed in 1839 after 38 citizens of Greene County successfully petitioned the Knoxville Presbytery of the Cumberland Presbyterian Church for the organization of a new congregation. The church building was constructed in 1841 on a  tract donated by John Harmon.  Funds for its construction were donated by James Carter, a local resident who had aspired to join the ministry, but died before he could realize his dream.

The building is of wood frame construction with rural Vernacular Greek Revival styling that stresses simplicity. It was added to the National Register of Historic Places in 1978.

References

External links
 New Bethel Cumberland Presbyterian Church, by bluebird218 on Flickr.com

Presbyterian churches in Tennessee
Churches on the National Register of Historic Places in Tennessee
Churches completed in 1841
19th-century Presbyterian church buildings in the United States
Buildings and structures in Greene County, Tennessee
Greeneville, Tennessee
Wooden churches in Tennessee
Cumberland Presbyterian Church
National Register of Historic Places in Greene County, Tennessee